The emblem of Yugoslavia featured six torches, surrounded by wheat with a red star at its top, and burning together in one flame; this represented the brotherhood and unity of the six federal republics forming Yugoslavia: Bosnia and Herzegovina, Croatia, Macedonia, Montenegro, Serbia and Slovenia. The date imprinted was 29 November 1943, the day the Anti-Fascist Council for the National Liberation of Yugoslavia (AVNOJ) met in Jajce on its second meeting and formed the basis for post-war organisation of the country, establishing a federal republic. This day was celebrated as Republic Day after the establishment of the republic. The emblem of Yugoslavia, along with those of its constituent republics, are an example of socialist heraldry.

History

Kingdom of Yugoslavia

The coat of arms of the 1918-1941 Kingdom of Yugoslavia (called the Kingdom of Serbs, Croats and Slovenes until 1929) evolved from the coat of arms of Serbia. Graphically the coats of arms were similar, featuring only two major differences, the first difference being the royal crowns. The royal Serbian coat of arms depicts the  Obrenović dynastic crown, while the royal Yugoslav coat of arms depicted the ruling  Karađorđević dynastic crown.

The second difference involved the shield surmounted on the white double-headed eagle. The previous  Serbian coat of arms depicted only the  Serbian tetragrammatic cross, representing only the  Serbian nation. When Yugoslavia formed in 1918, the surmounted shield changed to include symbolism for the newly-integrated Croat (red-and-white chequerboard) and Slovene nations, as the three official nations of Yugoslavia. The coat of arms includes three golden six-pointed stars arranged in the form of an upside-down triangle, adopted from the Slovenian coat-of-arms of the family of the Counts of Celje. An image of the royal Yugoslav coat of arms appears on the 10-Yugoslav dinar banknote of 1926.

Socialist Federal Republic of Yugoslavia

During World War II (1943–1945), the Yugoslav state was named Democratic Federal Yugoslavia (DFY), in 1945 it was renamed Federal People's Republic of Yugoslavia (FPRY), and again in 1963 into Socialist Federal Republic of Yugoslavia (SFRY). The emblem of socialist Yugoslavia was designed in 1943 and remained in use up to 1963, when the country underwent reforms and was renamed for the final time. It featured five torches surrounded by wheat and burning together in one flame; this represented the brotherhood and unity of the five nations of SFRY: Croats, Macedonians, Montenegrins, Serbs and Slovenes. The Bosniaks were not represented as a constituent nation, in spite of the fact that there existence of Bosniaks self-identifying as a nation had taken place since the late 19th century through the influence of figures such as Mehmed Kapetanović.

As part of the 1963 reforms, the name of the country was changed into Socialist Federal Republic of Yugoslavia and its emblem was redesigned to represent six Yugoslav federal republics (instead of the five nations). The new emblem was the final version with six torches, and was in official use until 1993 (past the country's dissolution in 1992). The date in the insignia remained in the new emblem.

Republic emblems
The emblems of the Yugoslav socialist republics were defined by each of its six constituent republics. Emblems appeared as a symbol of statehood on the documents of republican level, for example on the signs of the republican institutions, on watermarks of school diplomas, etc.

The emblems included old historical symbols where they could demonstrate historical compatibility with the new socialist political system – see Croatian and Serbian traditional emblem in the middle of their coats of arms; also Slovenian Mount Triglav was recognized as a symbol of Slovenian Liberation Front during the National Liberation War during World War II. Where the old symbols were deemed inappropriate (the traditional cross on the Serbian coat of arms, ethnic or religious coat of arms for Bosnia and Herzegovina, the former traditionally monarchist symbol for Montenegro or the historical lion for Macedonia), prominent features or unofficial national symbols were added, e.g. Mount Lovćen for Montenegro, or a pair of chimneys for Bosnia and Herzegovina. The same with the federal Yugoslav emblem: all separate republican emblems featured a red star and wheat, or other important plants from that region. The individual emblems of the six Yugoslav socialist republics were as follows:

See also

 Flag of Yugoslavia
 List of Yugoslav flags
 Coat of arms of Bosnia and Herzegovina
 Coat of arms of Croatia
 Emblem of North Macedonia
 Coat of arms of Montenegro
 Coat of arms of Serbia
 Coat of arms of Slovenia
 Socialist heraldry

References

External links

Arms of Yugoslavia evolution, Archives of Serbia

National symbols of Yugoslavia
Yugoslavia
Socialist Federal Republic of Yugoslavia
Yugoslavia
Yugoslavia
Yugoslavia
Yugoslavia
Yugoslavia
Yugoslavia
Yugoslavia
Yugoslavia
Yugoslavia

bg:Герб на Социалистическа федеративна република Югославия
bs:Grb SFRJ
cs:Státní znaky Jugoslávie
cs:Státní znak Socialistické federativní republiky Jugoslávie
de:Wappen der Sozialistischen Föderativen Republik Jugoslawien
es:Escudo de la República Federal Socialista de Yugoslavia
gl:Escudo da República Federal Socialista de Iugoslavia
hr:Grb SFRJ
it:Stemma della Repubblica Socialista Federale di Jugoslavia
he:סמל הרפובליקה הפדרלית הסוציאליסטית של יוגוסלביה
lt:Jugoslavijos herbas
mk:Грб на Социјалистичка Федеративна Република Југославија
pl:Herb Jugosławii
pt:Brasão de armas da República Socialista Federal da Jugoslávia
ro:Stema Republicii Socialiste Federative Iugoslavia
ru:Герб Югославии
sl:Grb Socialistične federativne republike Jugoslavije
sr:Грб Социјалистичке Федеративне Републике Југославије
sh:Grb SFRJ
zh:南斯拉夫社會主義聯邦共和國國徽